James S. Dent from Menomonee, Wisconsin was a member of the Wisconsin State Assembly.

Biography
Dent was born on August 1, 1831 in Hornellsville, New York. He married Lemyra J. Oliver on February 5, 1863. In 1876, he was an Assistant U.S. Marshal. Dent died of heart disease on May 23, 1906.

Assembly career
Dent was a member of the Assembly in 1876. He was a Republican.

References

External links

People from Hornellsville, New York
People from Menomonee Falls, Wisconsin
Republican Party members of the Wisconsin State Assembly
1831 births
1906 deaths
Burials in Wisconsin
19th-century American politicians